Zarechye is a rural locality (a selo) in Kabansky District, Republic of Buryatia, Russia. The population was 335 as of 2010. There are 10 streets.

Geography 
Zarechye is located 98 km northeast of Kabansk (the district's administrative centre) by road. Sukhaya is the nearest rural locality.

References 

Rural localities in Kabansky District
Populated places on Lake Baikal